Nenad Petrović is the name of:

 Nenad Petrović (writer) (1925–2014), Serbian writer
 Nenad Petrović (chess composer) (1907–1989), Croatian chess problemist
 Nenad Petrović (water polo) (born 1977), Macedonian water polo player